Stathmin-2 is a protein that in humans is encoded by the STMN2 gene.

Function 

Superior cervical ganglion-10 is a neuronal growth-associated protein which shares significant amino acid sequence similarity with the phosphoprotein stathmin (MIM 151442).[supplied by OMIM]

Interactions 

STMN2 has been shown to interact with RGS6.

References

Further reading